The Little Rann of Kutch is a salt marsh which is part of the Rann of Kutch in Kutch district, Gujarat, India.

Attractions

Indian wild ass sanctuary 
The Little Rann of Kutch is home to the Indian wild ass (khur). To conserve this species, the Indian Wild Ass Sanctuary (IWAS) was created in 1973 and covers nearly five thousand square km. The sanctuary is also home to many species of migratory birds, such as the sarus crane, ducks, the Dalmatian pelican, and flamingoes, as well as land birds like the sandgrouse, the francolin and the Indian bustard. It is also home to various mammals such as the Indian wolf, desert fox and nilgai.

Kutch biosphere reserve
In 2008, to project Kutch as an international nature destination, the Government of Gujarat designated the area as the Kutch Biosphere Reserve. Biosphere reserves aim to promote sustainable development in the surrounding area, which is reserved for conservation and research. Such reserves are protected under the Wildlife Protection Act, the Indian Forest Act and the Forest Conservation Act. The government provides funds for the conservation of the landscape's biological diversity and its cultural heritage.

The reserve's vegetation is mainly xerophytic as groundwater is scarce. The 74 elevated plateaus (also called islands or bets) have around 253 flowering species. According to some estimates, about 70,000 to 75,000 birds nest in an area of about 250 acres.

Economy

Salt panning
Salt panning is a crucial seasonal activity in the Rann of Kutch, producing the majority of India's inland salt. During the monsoon season, the underwater table of the Kutch is filled with saltwater. After the water recedes in October, salt workers temporarily settle and use diesel pumps to pump the saltwater into fields. Then, the natural climate conditions allow evaporation of the water, leaving only the salt crystals. Salt panning workers face severe health issues due to working in the harsh conditions in the fields continuously for 6–7 months. In 2019, as a means of financially supporting the salt pan workers and promoting a move from diesel to solar-powered pumps, the government of Gujarat allowed the state to purchase excess solar power generated during the off-season. Using solar-powered as opposed to diesel pumps can reduce the cost of salt production by one-third.

Ginger prawn fishing
Prawn fishing plays a role in the economy due to its high demand in domestic and international markets. Ginger prawn (Metapenaeus kutchensis) are endemic to the area, and their fishing is highly seasonal. During the monsoon season, which begins around July, the Little Rann is flooded and temporarily connected to the Gulf of Kutch, allowing passage of ginger prawn juveniles into the Rann. This marks the beginning of the prawn fishing season, which lasts from August to September. Fishermen are mostly seasonal workers, spending the majority of the year as salt pan workers.

Ginger prawn fishing dates back to the early 16th century, when it was practiced by Muslim subsistence fishermen during the Mughal dynasty. Their method, known as "Pagadia fishing" due to its being carried out by hand and barefoot, continues to be practiced by traditional fishermen in the region. Commercial prawn fishing only began in the mid-1900s after the use of bottom trawls became common.

Dam
The Government of Gujarat is planning to dam the 1.26 km stretch of Hadakiya Creek so that the water within it can be used for recreational and fisheries purposes.

See also
 Arid Forest Research Institute (AFRI)
 Great Rann of Kutch
 Indian wild ass
 Kutch District

References

  This text was originally published in the book Terrestrial ecoregions of the Indo-Pacific: a conservation assessment from Island Press. Also see: 

Indomalayan ecoregions
Flooded grasslands and savannas
Grasslands of India
Landforms of Gujarat
Marshes of India
Salt marshes
Geography of Kutch district